Foundations of World Unity is a collection of talks and writings of ʻAbdu'l-Bahá, leader of the Baháʼí Faith, dated prior to his death in November 1921, and first published in 1945. The introduction to the 1945 edition is dated 1927.

It includes mainly selected talks from Promulgation of Universal Peace, and a few passages from Baháʼí Scriptures, Selections from the Writings of ʻAbdu'l-Bahá and Some Answered Questions.

Contents
The True Modernism 
The Source Of Reality 
The Dawn Of Peace 
The Cause Of Strife 
Universal Peace 
The Prophets And War 
Foundations Of World Unity 
Racial Harmony 
The Spirit Of Justice 
Cooperation 
The Criteria Of Truth 
Man And Nature 
The Microcosm And The Macrocosm 
The Universal Cycles 
Education 
The Holy Spirit 
Science 
Spiritual Springtime 
Eternal Unity 
The Darkened Lights 
The Need Of Divine Education 
Religion: Essential And Non-Essential 
Religion Renewed 
Divine Love 
The Foundation Of Religion 
The Quickening Spirit 
The Law Of God 
Continuity Of Revelation

See also
 World Unity Conference

References

External links
Foundations of World Unity Cross-Referenced to Other Works
 Bahai.works, an online repository of books, letters and tablets related to the Baháʼí Faith. bahai.works

Works by `Abdu'l-Bahá